Warren B. Offutt (February 13, 1928 – September 20, 2017) was an American amateur astronomer and amateur radio operator.

Offutt is credited by the Minor Planet Center with the discovery of 17 asteroids and has notably collaborated with professional astronomers in observing Kuiper belt objects (KBOs). In 1999 he won the Amateur Achievement Award of the Astronomical Society of the Pacific.

Offutt and his wife, Beverly (since deceased), moved from Illinois to New Mexico when he retired from engineering, specializing in precision astrometry of faint objects in the Solar System. He operates the W & B Observatory in the U.S. village of Cloudcroft, New Mexico, in the Sacramento Mountains, at an altitude of 2500 m (8300 ft).

In 1997, Offutt helped with three more major discoveries, among them confirmation of a then-newly discovered moon of Uranus, Sycorax.

On 11 February 1998, the outer main-belt asteroid 7639 Offutt was named after him, just before his 70th birthday.

References

External links 
 Discovery of two distant irregular moons of Uranus, nature, 11 February 1998
 Warren B. Offutt Obituary, www.legacy.com

1928 births
20th-century American astronomers
21st-century American astronomers
Discoverers of asteroids
2017 deaths
People from Otero County, New Mexico
Amateur radio people